Max Olesker and Ivan Gonzalez are a British comedy duo known collectively as Max & Ivan. They are the creators, writers and stars of the BBC Radio 4 series The Casebook of Max & Ivan and Channel 4 Comedy Blap The Reunion. They also appear together as Ben & Jerry in BBC Two's W1A. The duo met at Royal Holloway, University of London where they produced the radio show (and later podcast) Max and Ivàn: Exposed for the college's Insanity Radio station. They co-founded London  improvised comedy theatre The Free Association and perform live narrative sketch comedy across the world.

Style and influences 
In episode 73 of The Comedian's Comedian with Stuart Goldsmith, Max & Ivan describe their live shows as narrative sketch comedy; writing character-led narratives that feature interweaving plot lines. They perform these multi-character shows with no costume changes and minimal use of props.

Comedy acts that Max & Ivan have cited as influences include The League of Gentlemen, Victoria Wood, Lucas and Walliams, Steve Coogan and the Marx Brothers.

References 

British comedy duos
British sketch comedians